Jakov Lukarević, Jakov Lukarić or Jakov Luccari may refer to:

 Jakov Lukarević (bishop) (c.1513–1575), Ragusan Franciscan prelate of the Catholic Church
 Jakov Lukarević (historian) (c.1547–1615), Ragusan historian and diplomat